The men's individual all-around was a gymnastics event contested as part of the Gymnastics at the 1964 Summer Olympics programme at the Tokyo Metropolitan Gymnasium. It was held on 18 and 20 October. There were 130 competitors from 30 nations. Each nation could send a team of 6 gymnasts or up to 3 individuals. The event was won by Yukio Endō of Japan, the nation's first victory in the event after two consecutive Games with silver medals. Endō snapped the Soviet Union's three-Games gold medal streak and started a three-Games streak for Japan, as the two nations reached the height of their four-decade combined dominance of the event. Three silver medals were awarded after a tie between Viktor Lisitsky and Boris Shakhlin of the Soviet Union and Shuji Tsurumi of Japan. Shakhlin, the defending gold medalist, thus became the seventh man to win multiple medals in the all-around. For the second consecutive Games, Japan and the Soviet Union took 11 of the top 13 places (and, for the second consecutive Games, Yugoslavia's Miroslav Cerar and Italy's Franco Menichelli were the two men in the top 10 not from those two nations).

Background

This was the 14th appearance of the men's individual all-around. The first individual all-around competition had been held in 1900, after the 1896 competitions featured only individual apparatus events. A men's individual all-around has been held every Games since 1900.

Eight of the top 10 gymnasts from the 1960 Games returned: gold medalist Boris Shakhlin of the Soviet Union, two-time silver medalist Takashi Ono of Japan, two-time bronze medalist Yuri Titov of the Soviet Union, fourth-place finisher Shuji Tsurumi of Japan, fifth-place finisher Yukio Endō of Japan, eighth-place finisher Miroslav Cerar of Yugoslavia, ninth-place finisher Takashi Mitsukuri of Japan, and tenth-place finisher Franco Menichelli of Italy. Titov was the reigning (1962) World Champion, with Endō and Shakhlin (the 1958 World Champion) finishing second and third.

Algeria, the Republic of China, Iran, Mongolia, and the Philippines each made their debut in the event. France and Italy both made their 12th appearance, tied for most among nations.

Competition format

The gymnastics all-around events continued to use the aggregation format. All entrants in the gymnastics competitions performed both a compulsory exercise and a voluntary exercise for each apparatus. The scores for all 12 exercises were summed to give an individual all-around score.

These exercise scores were also used for qualification for the apparatus finals. The two exercises (compulsory and voluntary) for each apparatus were summed to give an apparatus score; the top 6 in each apparatus participated in the finals; others were ranked 7th through 130th. There was no all-around final.

Exercise scores ranged from 0 to 10, apparatus scores from 0 to 20, and individual totals from 0 to 120.

Schedule

All times are Japan Standard Time (UTC+9)

Results

The score for the individual all-around was a simple sum of each gymnast's preliminary scores from the six apparatus events.

References

Sources
 

Gymnastics at the 1964 Summer Olympics
Men's events at the 1964 Summer Olympics